The 2020-21 Robert Morris Colonials men's ice hockey season was the 17th and final season of play for the program and the 11th season in the Atlantic Hockey conference. The Colonials represent Robert Morris University and were coached by Derek Schooley, in his 17th season.

Season
As a result of the ongoing COVID-19 pandemic the entire college ice hockey season was delayed. Because the NCAA had previously announced that all winter sports athletes would retain whatever eligibility they possessed through at least the following year, none of Canisius' players would lose a season of play. However, the NCAA also approved a change in its transfer regulations that would allow players to transfer and play immediately rather than having to sit out a season, as the rules previously required.

Robert Morris began the season well and continued their strong play for most of the year. The team was buoyed by the addition of two freshman, Randy Hernández and Noah West, who made major contributions to the offense and defense respectively. By mid-January RMU found themselves ranked in the top 20 with an 11–3 record and a chance to make the NCAA Tournament without having to win their conference tournament, a rarity for Atlantic Hockey. Unfortunately, the team was hit by several COVID cancellations and ended up losing 4 of their final 7 games entering the Atlantic Hockey Tournament. It was still possible for the Colonials to make the tournament without an Atlantic Hockey Championship, but any chance the team had was washed away when the offense faltered against Niagara and the team was knocked out in the quarterfinals.

On May 26, 2021, it was announced that Robert Morris University would be ending both its men and women's varsity hockey programs, effective immediately.

Departures

Recruiting

Roster
As of December 31, 2020.

Standings

Schedule and Results

|-
!colspan=12 style=";" | Regular Season

|-
!colspan=12 style=";" | 

|- align="center" bgcolor="#e0e0e0"
|colspan=12|Robert Morris Lost Series 1–2

Scoring Statistics

Goaltending statistics

Rankings

USCHO did not release a poll in week 20.

Awards and honors

References

Robert Morris Colonials men's ice hockey seasons
Robert Morris Colonials
Robert Morris Colonials
Robert Morris Colonials
2021 in sports in Pennsylvania
2020 in sports in Pennsylvania